Marun is a surname which is also used as a masculine given name. People with the name are as follows:

Surname
 Carlos Marun (born 1960), Brazilian politician
 Lujo Marun (1857–1939), Croatian Franciscan priest and pioneer of Croatian archeology
 Nahim Marun, Brazilian pianist

Given name
 Marun Al Naqqash (1855–1817), Sidon-born Maronite who produced the first theatre play texts in Arabic

See also
 Marun